The 2002–03 Israeli Hockey League season was the 12th season of Israel's hockey league. Five teams participated in the league, and HC Ma'alot won the championship.

Regular season

External links 
 Season on hockeyarchives.info

Israeli League
Israeli League (ice hockey) seasons
Seasons